Fence is an unincorporated community in the town of Fence, Florence County, Wisconsin, United States. Fence has a post office with ZIP code 54120.

The origin of the name "Fence" is obscure.

References

Unincorporated communities in Florence County, Wisconsin
Unincorporated communities in Wisconsin
Iron Mountain micropolitan area